Guyanese Canadians are Canadian citizens of Guyanese descent or Guyana-born persons who reside in Canada.

The following are notable Canadians of Guyanese descent:

Notable Guyanese Canadians

Entertainers
Anjulie - singer
Dave Baksh - lead guitarist for the band Sum 41 (now Brown Brigade)
Deborah Cox - singer
Simone Denny - singer
Melanie Fiona - singer
Keysha Freshh - rapper
Nicole Holness - singer and TV host
JDiggz - rapper
Vaughn Lal - bassist and backing vocalist for band Brown Brigade
Rich London - rapper
Shakira Baksh - fashion model and actress 
Maestro Fresh Wes - rapper and actor
More or Les - rapper and DJ
Saukrates - rapper and hip hop producer
Melinda Shankar - actress, television series Degrassi: The Next Generation
Eon Sinclair - bassist for the band Bedouin Soundclash
Maiko Watson - former member of Sugar Jones
Roy Woods - rapper and singer
P Reign now known as Preme - rapper
Priyanka - drag queen, winner of the first season of Canada's Drag Race

Politics
James Douglas - Governor of Vancouver Island and Governor of British Columbia.
James W. Douglas - British Columbia MLA
Ovid Jackson - former Liberal Party Member of Parliament and former Mayor of Owen Sound
Victor Quelch - Social Credit Party of Canada Member of Parliament for Acadia
John Rodriguez - former New Democratic Party Member of Parliament for Nickel Belt and former Mayor of Sudbury

Sports
Charles Allen - hurdler and sprinter
Troy Amos-Ross -  boxer
Andreas Athanasiou - ice hockey player
Natasha Bacchus - deaf athlete
Sheridon Baptiste - bobsledder, sprinter, Canadian football player
Ian Beckles - American football player
Alex Bunbury -  soccer player
Laura Creavalle - Guyanese-born Canadian/American professional bodybuilder
Keevil Daly - weightlifter
Ian Danney - bobsledder
Nicholas de Groot - first-class cricketer 
Dwayne De Rosario - soccer player
Sunil Dhaniram - first-class cricketer
Philip Edwards - Olympic sprinter 1928, 1932, 1936; five-time Olympic medalist 
Nicolette Fernandes - squash player
Gary Holmes - wrestler 
Lawrence Holmes - wrestler
Charmaine Hooper - soccer player
Lyndon Hooper - soccer player
Priscilla Lopes-Schliep - hurdler
Egerton Marcus -  boxer
Mark McKoy -  hurdler
Jaime Peters - soccer player 
Danny Ramnarais - first-class cricketer
Quillan Roberts, soccer player
Abdool Samad - first-class cricketer
Walter Spence - swimmer
Paul Stalteri - soccer player
Stella Umeh - gymnast

Guyanese Canadians by Canadian province or territory (2016)

See also
Guyanese people
Black Canadians
Guyanese Americans
Guyanese in the United Kingdom

References

External links
History of Guyanese Canadians

Caribbean Canadian
Guyanese
 Canada